Kill Time is a 2016 romance suspense crime film directed by Fruit Chan. A Chinese-Hong Kong co-production, the film was released on February 14, 2016 in China by Wuzhou Film Distribution and Wanda Pictures and is scheduled for release in Hong Kong on March 10, 2016.

Plot

Cast
Angelababy
Ethan Juan
Zhang Juck
Rayza
Hao Lei
Huang Jue
Yin Zhusheng
Pan Hong
Kou Zhenhai
Lam Suet
Song Ning

Reception
The film has grossed  in China.

References

Chinese romance films
Hong Kong romance films
Chinese suspense films
Films directed by Fruit Chan
2010s romance films
2010s crime films
Wuzhou Film Distribution films
Wanda Pictures films
2010s Hong Kong films